Magnolia Grove may refer to:

Magnolia Grove (Dayton, Alabama), plantation house and historic district, also known as the William Poole House
Magnolia Grove (Greensboro, Alabama), historic mansion
Magnolia Grove (Iron Station, North Carolina), listed on the NRHP in Lincoln County, North Carolina
Magnolia Grove, Houston, neighborhood in Houston, Texas
Magnolia Grove Monastery, Buddhist monastery Batesville, Mississippi